Scopula decolor is a moth of the family Geometridae. It was described by Staudinger in 1898. It is found in Spain, Portugal and Italy and on Cyprus and Sardinia. It is also found in North Africa, including the type location of Algeria.

References

Moths of Europe
Moths of Africa
Moths described in 1898
decolor
Taxa named by Otto Staudinger